Pantagruel is an international Early Music ensemble specialising in semi-staged performances of Renaissance music.  The group was formed in Essen, Germany at the end of  2002 by the English lutenist Mark Wheeler (Lutes, Citterns & Gittern) and the German born Dominik Schneider (Renaissance Recorders & Flutes, Gittern & Vocals). With the arrival of the Scottish Soprano Hannah Morrison in 2004 the ensemble began to perform throughout Europe. Recent Pantagruel performances have taken place at the Münster Baroque Festival, Utrecht Early Music Festival, Aachen Bach Festival and the National Portrait Gallery in London. In 2009 Morrison was replaced by Danish Soprano Anna Maria Wierød.

Named after Pantagruel, the protagonist of François Rabelais’s 1532 novel Gargantua and Pantagruel, they have adopted the book's motto "do what thou wilt" to describe their fresh approach to early music. They combine serious musicological research with their experience not only in classical music, but also in rock music, jazz, theatre and dance, and their performances further expand classical concert conventions by using renaissance practices of medley, improvisation and  gesture.

Discography 
 2006: Elizium - Elizabethan Ballads, Ayres & Dances 
 2008: Laydie Louthians Lilte - Ballads, Ayres & Dances from 17th Century Scotland
 2011: Nymphidia - The Court of Faerie

External links
Official Pantagruel Homepage
Official Pantagruel MySpace Page

Mixed early music groups
Renaissance music
Musical groups established in 2002
2002 establishments in Germany